The Großer Daumen is a mountain,  high, in the Daumen Group of the Allgäu Alps in southern Germany.

Location and area 
Nestling below the Großer Daumen are the small tarns of Laufbichlsee, Koblatsee and Engeratsgundsee.

Ascent 
The peak is also the end point of the Hindelang Klettersteig climbing path, which runs from the Nebelhorn to the Großer Daumen.

External links

References 

Mountains of Bavaria
Allgäu Alps
Two-thousanders of Germany
Mountains of the Alps